Hikaru Ichijyo (一条 輝 Ichijō Hikaru) is one of the main fictional characters of the Macross Japanese anime series. His voice actor was Arihiro Hase. After the death of Arihiro Hase in 1996, he was voiced by Kenji Nojima in the PlayStation 2 Macross video game from 2003. In the English dub of the series produced by ADV Films, he is voiced by Vic Mignogna.

The original animation and the distributors Bandai Visual and Victor Entertainment romanizes his name as Hikaru Ichijyo, while AnimEigo and ADV Films also use Hikaru Ichijo and Hikaro Ichijo.

Background

According to the fictional continuity of Macross, Hikaru Ichijyo is Japanese. Hikaru grew up with his father as a talented aerobatic flier, having won seven amateur flying contests by the age of 16 in 2009. When his "senpai" Roy Föcker invited him to the launch ceremony of the SDF-1 Macross he found himself pulled into a galactic war against an alien race called the Zentradi. He later joins the UN Spacy after a talk with Föcker and Lynn Minmay. Shortly after joining, he gains a reputation as a skilled pilot and leader, and he is promoted to second lieutenant and later first lieutenant. He pilots the VF-1S Valkyrie "Skull One" after the death of Föcker, and is eventually promoted to captain at the end of the series.

His personal feelings tend toward two women: his friend-turned-idol Japanese-Chinese girl Lynn Minmay, and Misa Hayase. While initially growing feelings for Minmay, he also begins to grow a fondness for Misa throughout the series. The relationship between Hikaru and Misa slowly evolved throughout the series. In the beginning, they had a difficult superior-subordinate relationship, starting with Hikaru calling Misa "old woman" (obasan) when he saw her for the first time on his Valkyrie's screen. However, the intensity of their relationship gradually softened after going through a series of crises and intimate moments together: Hikaru rescued Misa from the Mars base before the base exploded (Episode 7: Bye Bye Mars); they had their first "mission kiss" while demonstrating "Protoculture" to the Zentradi people (Episode 11: First Contact) and later managed to escape together (Episode 12: Big Escape); they accidentally shared an evening together while trapped in the transformed Macross and revealed to each other their respective lovelorn stories (Episode 21: Micro Cosmo).

While they were still unsure of their own feelings, both felt deep loneliness after Misa departed Macross to Earth, trying to persuade the United Government to enter peace negotiations with the Zentradi troops. Clumsy at communicating his feelings, Hikaru sent Misa the message "Wish you return to Macross safely" using the Morse code (Episode 24: Goodbye, Girl).

At the end of the Space War I, Hikaru ventured into the ruined Alaska base on Earth and rescued the sole survivor Misa. After their reunion, Hikaru told Misa that even though they were probably the only survivors on earth, he was happy as long as the partner was Misa (Episode 27: Love Flows By).

After Space War I, Hikaru spent 6 months on the Apollo base on the moon as a test pilot for one of the first prototypes of the VF-4 Lightning III variable fighter set to replace the VF-1 Valkyrie.

After he returned to Earth (Episodes 29 to 36), the love triangle of Misa-Hikaru-Minmay underwent many turns due to Hikaru's inability to be frank with his own feelings. As a result, Misa was deeply hurt by Hikaru's lingering feeling for Lynn Minmay. However, Hikaru eventually realized that he could not live without Misa after the heartbroken Misa confessed her love for him while bidding farewell to him.

The two got married on October 10, 2011 and their first daughter Ichijo Miku was born a year later.

In 2012, Misa and Hikaru were appointed as the Commander of the new SDF-2 Megaroad-01 ship and the Capitan of the ship's escorting Valkyrie group, inaugurating the space colonization chapter in the Macross history.

In 2016, Megaroad-01 lost contact with Earth and Misa, Hikaru, Miku and the ship's crew and citizens (including Lynn Minmay, who remained as their friend and also boarded the ship) were declared missing.

Adaptation 
When The Super Dimension Fortress Macross series was adapted into the first third of the 1985 American animated series Robotech, Ichijyo was renamed "Rick Hunter" and went through numerous changes to fit into the Robotech canon. While the original Japanese series featured a Japanese Ichijyo, Hunter was instead an American who grew up in California. Roy Fokker, a childhood friend of Ichijyo in the original series, has since been retconned into Hunter's literal brother – adopted by Hunter's father after the death of Fokker's real father.

Hunter and Ichijyo both have separate canon about their lives after the end of their initial series. By possible coincidence, these are slightly similar. In the spin-off film Flash Back 2012, Ichijo is seen departing with his wife on an interstellar expedition on the SDF-2 Megaroad-01. Hunter and his wife, Lisa Hayes, make a similar trip in Robotech II: The Sentinels, wherein they depart the Earth in search for the home world of the Robotech Masters on board the SDF-3. While Robotech II was released one year after Flash Back 2012, The Sentinels had been in production for years before the music video collection. While the official Macross canon has the crew of the Megaroad disappearing four years into their mission, animated and printed Robotech material has shown Hunter's expedition failing in a different light – being stranded at Tirol and failing to protect Earth from the Masters or the Invid. After the Invid invade, Hunter leads the fleet against the reclaiming of Earth.

Appearances in later media
Hikaru Ichijyo's legacy within the ongoing future history of the Macross series has been a palpable presence. Both the Macross 7 and the Macross Frontier anime television series contains numerous references to Ichijyo's career on the SDF-1.

In Macross 7, the Macross 7 fleet enact a play entitled "Do You Remember love?", which retells the events of Macross: Do You Remember Love? (which is revealed to be a film within the Macross universe retelling the events of the First Space War). Basara Nekki, the main character of the Macross 7 TV series, plays the role of Hikaru Ichijyo in the film. 

In Macross Frontier, the Mihoshi Academy on board the Macross Frontier has a VF-1S fighter atop the roof. It is revealed at one point to be Ichijyo's first fighter as leader of the Vermilion Squad of Skull Squadron.  In Macross Frontier, Alto Saotome, as most junior pilot of S.M.S.'s Skull Platoon (a similar position to Ichijyo's), has his VF-25 Messiah fighter decorated in the same colors as Hikaru's VF-1A (and later S) from Macross: Do You Remember Love.

References

External links
Official Macross website 

Fictional space pilots
Television characters introduced in 1982
Fictional Japanese people in anime and manga
Macross characters
Male characters in anime and manga